The 1948 European Figure Skating Championships were held in Prague, Czechoslovakia. Elite senior-level figure skaters from European ISU member nations, in addition to the United States and Canada, competed for the title of European Champion in the disciplines of men's singles, ladies' singles, and pair skating.

Because North Americans were allowed to participate, the best European single skaters, Eva Pawlik of Austria and Hans Gerschwiler of Switzerland, were awarded only the European Silver Medals. That was the reason the International Skating Union restricted the 1949 Europeans and all the following European Championships to European skaters.

Results

Men
Button is the only winner from outside Europe in men's singles.

Ladies
Scott is the only winner from outside Europe in ladies' singles.

Pairs

References

External links
 results

European Figure Skating Championships, 1948
European Figure Skating Championships, 1948
European Figure Skating Championships
Figure skating in Czechoslovakia
International figure skating competitions hosted by Czechoslovakia
Sports competitions in Prague
1940s in Prague